The Apostolic Vicariate of Aden was the First Vicariate created in Arabia, It was established in 1888 and in 1889, it was dissolved and renamed into the Apostolic Vicariate of Arabia.

History 
The territory was originally part of the Vicariate Apostolic of the Gallas, which covered the entire Arabian Peninsula and Somaliland but it was separated into an Apostolic Prefecture by Pope Pius IX on 21 January 1875. On 25 April 1888, Pope Leo XIII then created the Apostolic Vicariate of Aden, located in Yemen and within a year it was redrawn and renamed into the Apostolic Vicariate of Arabia on June 28, 1889.

Prefects of Aden 

 Cardinal Guglielmo Massaia, O.F.M. Cap. (12 May 1846 - 1854)
 Fr. Luigi Sturla. (1854 – 1858)
 Fr. Giovenale da Tortosa, O.F.M. Cap. (1858 – 1864)  
 Bishop Louis-Callixte Lasserre, O.F.M. Cap. (12 October 1871 - 04 May 1888) and (04 May 1888 - 28 June 1889) as Apostolic Vicar.

References 

Apostolic vicariates
Catholic Church in Asia
Christianity in the Arab world
Catholic Church in Yemen
Catholic Church in Somaliland
Roman Catholic dioceses in the Middle East
Religious organizations established in 1888
Roman Catholic dioceses and prelatures established in the 19th century
Roman Catholic dioceses in Arabia
Catholic Church in the Arabian Peninsula